Peter Charles Tinley  (born 9 July 1962) is an Australian politician and former soldier. Peter has been a Labor Party member of the Western Australian Legislative Assembly since November 2009, representing the electorate of Willagee.

Early life and military career
Born in the northern Perth suburb of Karrinyup, Tinley joined the Australian Army in 1981 and graduated from Royal Military College, Duntroon, earning the Queen's Medal as the cadet graduating top of his class. He spent 17 of his 25 years in the army in the Special Air Service Regiment (SASR). In 2002, he was the lead tactical planner for Australia's special forces advising the United States, and in 2003 he served as Deputy Commander for the Special Forces Task Group in Iraq. In the same year, he was appointed a Member of the Order of Australia (AM) in the military division for "dynamic leadership and consistent professional excellence".

In late 2006, after leaving the army with the rank of major, Tinley spoke out against the decision of the Howard government to support the US and British initiative to invade Iraq on the basis of purported evidence of the country's possession of weapons of mass destruction. He also called for the immediate withdrawal of Australian troops.

In the meantime, Tinley conducted strategic planning and leadership workshops. Among other clients, he worked with the West Coast Eagles Football Club coaching staff. He also ran a small business.

Political career
In 2006, former federal opposition leader Kim Beazley approached Tinley to run for the federal Division of Stirling as the Labor Party's endorsed candidate at the 2007 election. The sitting member, Liberal MP Michael Keenan, retained the seat with a slightly reduced majority.

Upon the resignation of former Premier Alan Carpenter from the safe Labor state seat of Willagee, Tinley was preselected to run for Labor at the resulting by-election on 28 November 2009. He was ultimately elected as the member for Willagee with over 60% of the two-party-preferred vote against the Greens' Hsien Harper.

Upon Labor's election to government at the 2017 state election, Tinley was appointed to the McGowan Ministry as Minister for Mines and Petroleum, Veterans Issues, and Youth on 17 March. Five days later on 22 March, Tinley resigned as Mines and Petroleum minister, to avoid any claim of conflict of interest due to a family member working in the industry, and exchanged the Housing portfolio with Bill Johnston. Tinley later became Western Australia's Asian Engagement Minister.

On 19 March 2021, after the 2021 state election, Tinley was unexpectedly removed from cabinet.

References

External links
 Photo from the West Australian newspaper after Tinley became a Member of the Order of Australia

1962 births
Australian Army officers
Australian military personnel of the Iraq War
Royal Military College, Duntroon graduates
Living people
Members of the Order of Australia
Members of the Western Australian Legislative Assembly
Politicians from Perth, Western Australia
University of New England (Australia) alumni
Australian Labor Party members of the Parliament of Western Australia
21st-century Australian politicians